The list below summarizes Brabham race cars built by Motor Racing Developments in the United Kingdom.

Note that many of the earlier models are badged as Repco Brabhams.

References

Brabham
Brabham racing cars